Ged or GED may refer to:

Places
 Ged, Louisiana, an unincorporated community in the United States
 Ged, a village in Bichiwara Tehsil, Dungarpur District, Rajasthan, India
 Delaware Coastal Airport, in Delaware, US, callsign GED

People
 Ged Baldwin (1907–1991), Canadian politician
 William Ged (1699–1749), Scottish goldsmith and inventor
 Ged Peck (born 1947), English guitarist
 Ged Quinn (born 1963), English artist and musician
 Ged Walker (1960–2003), English police officer
 Ged Maybury (born 1953), New Zealand author

Other uses 
 Ged (Earthsea), a fictional character in Ursula K. Le Guin's Earthsea realm
 Ged (heraldry), a term for the fish known in English as a pike
 Ged, northern English and Lowland Scots name for the pike fish Esox
 "G.E.D." (My Name Is Earl), a television episode
 .ged, a genealogical data format
 Clan Ged, a Scottish clan
 Graduated electronic decelerator, a device for administering electric shocks

Acronyms
 Gas electron diffraction
 General Educational Development test, an American and Canadian high school-level exam
 Graph edit distance, in mathematics